Poiana Câmpina is a commune in Prahova County, Muntenia, Romania. It is composed of four villages: Bobolia, Pietrișu, Poiana Câmpina and Răgman.

It lies on the right bank of the Prahova River; the city of Câmpina is right across the river. The Romanian Railways line connecting Ploiești to Brașov passes through the commune, with train stations at Câmpina and Bobolia.

Notes

Communes in Prahova County
Localities in Muntenia